Taiga Kantāne (born 27 March 1970) is a Latvian athlete who has competed for her country at the 2012 and 2016 Summer Paralympics in the discus and shot put.

Career
Taiga Kantāne was born on 27 March 1970 in Bauska, Semigallia, Latvia. She had a stroke which paralysed one side of her body in 2005. After being unable to continue with her previous hobbies because of the disability, Kantāne looked for an active pursuit. In 2007 with the advice of coach Aldi Crane, she took up discus and shot put, seeking to go to the Summer Paralympics.

Kantāne was selected as one of nine members of the Latvian team for the 2012 Summer Paralympics. In the discus, she finished ninth in the same class. She was once again named to the Latvian team for the 2016 Summer Paralympics in Rio de Janeiro, Brazil.

References

1970 births
Living people
Athletes (track and field) at the 2012 Summer Paralympics
Athletes (track and field) at the 2016 Summer Paralympics
Latvian shot putters
Latvian female discus throwers
Paralympic athletes of Latvia
People from Bauska